
Gmina Pilchowice is a rural gmina (administrative district) in Gliwice County, Silesian Voivodeship, in southern Poland.

The gmina contains part of the protected area called Rudy Landscape Park.

Villages
Gmina Pilchowice contains the villages and settlements of Kuźnia Nieborowska, Leboszowice, Nieborowice, Pilchowice, Stanica, Wilcza and Żernica.

Neighbouring gminas
Gmina Pilchowice is bordered by the towns of Gliwice, Knurów and Rybnik, and by the gminas of Czerwionka-Leszczyny, Kuźnia Raciborska and Sośnicowice.

Twin towns – sister cities

Gmina Pilchowice is twinned with:
 Bobritzsch-Hilbersdorf, Germany

References

Pilchowice
Gliwice County